Tommy Hamilton (born 1935 in Bray) is a former Irish footballer who played as a forward. He was educated at Synge Street CBS in Dublin.

His first club was Manchester United whom he joined in 1953 where he began playing as an inside forward for the third team and reserves. Hamilton had played for Johnville F.C., where he was trained and scouted by Jem Kennedy who sent him to Manchester United. However, Hamilton was not prepared for being conscripted so he came home to sign for Shamrock Rovers in November 1955  and made his debut against Waterford at Kilcohan Park on 6 November in a League of Ireland Shield match.

The following season he was the League's top scorer.

Hamilton scored twice for Rovers in the European Champion Clubs' Cup. After scoring at OGC Nice he was ruled out of the home leg due to tonsillitis. He played three times in Europe for the Hoops.

He won two caps for the Republic of Ireland making his debut in a 2–0 win over Czechoslovakia on 5 April 1959 in Ireland's first ever European Championship qualifier at Dalymount Park. His second and final cap was in the return game at Tehelne pole, Bratislava on 10 May. He also won one Republic of Ireland B national football team cap in 1960 scoring both goals in a 2–1 win over Iceland.

Tommy finished up scoring 44 League goals and 9 FAI Cup goals as well as his 2 European strikes. He represented the League of Ireland 20 times in his seven years at Milltown scoring once.

His last competitive game for the Hoops was the 1962 FAI Cup final in which he scored twice. This made up for being bizarrely dropped for the 1957 and 1958 finals.

He shared his benefit with Maxie McCann against Sunderland at Dalymount Park on 30 April 1962. That match was Tommy Hamilton's last match for Rovers as he joined Cork Hibernians in a player-exchange deal that brought Jackie Mooney to Milltown.

The following week he won the Soccer Personality of the Year Award.

Hamilton spent three season there before moving to Limerick F.C. where he made another Cup Final appearance losing to Rovers. This qualified Limerick for the 1965–66 European Cup Winners' Cup where Hamilton appeared.

He retired in January 1969.

Honours
League of Ireland: 2
  Shamrock Rovers - 1956/57, 1958/59
FAI Cup: 2
  Shamrock Rovers - 1956, 1962
League of Ireland Shield: 3
  Shamrock Rovers - 1955/56, 1956/57, 1957/58
Leinster Senior Cup: 3
  Shamrock Rovers - 1956, 1957, 1958
Dublin City Cup: 3
  Shamrock Rovers - 1956/57, 1957/58, 1959/60
Top Four Cup: 2
  Shamrock Rovers - 1956, 1958
 SWAI Personality of the Year
  Shamrock Rovers - 1961/62
 Hall of Fame
  Shamrock Rovers - 1996/97

References

Sources
 The Hoops by Paul Doolan and Robert Goggins

Association footballers from County Wicklow
Association football forwards
Republic of Ireland association footballers
Republic of Ireland international footballers
Republic of Ireland B international footballers
Shamrock Rovers F.C. players
Cork Hibernians F.C. players
Limerick F.C. players
League of Ireland players
1935 births
Living people
League of Ireland XI players
People educated at Synge Street CBS